Ke'Bryan Kobe Hayes (born January 28, 1997) is an American professional baseball third baseman for the Pittsburgh Pirates of Major League Baseball (MLB). He made his MLB debut in 2020.

Amateur career
Hayes attended Concordia Lutheran High School in Tomball, Texas. He committed to play college baseball at the University of Tennessee. In 2015, as a high school senior, Hayes hit .436 with three home runs, 27 runs batted in (RBI), and 12 stolen bases.

Professional career
The Pittsburgh Pirates selected Hayes in the first round, with the 32nd overall selection, of the 2015 MLB draft. Foregoing his college commitment, Hayes signed with Pittsburgh, and spent 2015 with both the Gulf Coast League Pirates and the West Virginia Black Bears, batting a combined .308, with 20 RBI, in 56 games.

In 2016, Hayes spent the season with the West Virginia Power, where he earned South Atlantic League All-Star honors and compiled a .263 average, with six home runs, and 37 RBI, in 65 games. In 2017, Hayes moved up with the Bradenton Marauders, where he batted .278, with two home runs, and 43 RBI, in 108 games and was named a Florida State League All-Star.

Hayes played for the Altoona Curve in 2018, and was named an Eastern League All-Star and slashing .293/.375/.444 with seven home runs and 47 RBIs in 117 games. In 2019, Hayes split the season between the West Virginia Black Bears and the Indianapolis Indians, hitting .261/.334/.411/.745, with 10 home runs, and 55 RBI. Following the season, he was added to the Pirates 40-man roster.

On July 19, 2020, it was announced that Hayes had tested positive for COVID-19. On September 1, 2020, the Pirates promoted him to the majors. Making his MLB debut the same day, he hit his first career home run against the Chicago Cubs. Hayes received five votes in 2020 National League Rookie of the Year voting, finishing in sixth place.

In his 2021 season debut against the Cubs, Hayes hit a home run in his first at bat of the season. On April 4, 2021, Hayes was placed on the 10-day injured list due to left wrist inflammation after leaving a game the previous day because of the injury. On May 9, Hayes was placed on the 60-day injured list. He was activated on June 3. On June 11, Hayes became the quickest Pirate to 20 career extra-base hits in the modern era, one game faster than Barry Bonds.

Hayes finished the 2021 season batting .257/.316/.373 with 6 home runs, 38 RBIs and 9 stolen bases in 96 games. He was awarded the Fielding Bible Award for excellent defense as a third baseman.

On April 7, 2022, Hayes agreed to an eight-year, $70 million contract extension with the Pirates, which became official on April 12.

Personal life
Hayes is the son of Charlie Hayes, and younger brother of former minor league pitcher Tyree Hayes.

See also
 List of second-generation Major League Baseball players

References

External links

1997 births
Living people
African-American baseball players
Altoona Curve players
Baseball players from Texas
Bradenton Marauders players
Gulf Coast Pirates players
Indianapolis Indians players
Major League Baseball third basemen
People from Tomball, Texas
Pittsburgh Pirates players
West Virginia Black Bears players
West Virginia Power players
21st-century African-American sportspeople